Josef Kruz (born 1889, date of death unknown) was a Czechoslovak sports shooter. He competed in the 25 m rapid fire pistol event at the 1924 Summer Olympics.

References

External links
 

1889 births
Year of death missing
Czechoslovak male sport shooters
Olympic shooters of Czechoslovakia
Shooters at the 1924 Summer Olympics
Place of birth missing